Robert Willoughby, 1st Baron Willoughby de Broke, de jure 9th Baron Latimer (c. 1452 – 23 August 1502), KG, of Brook, near Westbury, Wiltshire, was one of the chief commanders of the royal forces of King Henry VII against the Cornish rebellion of 1497.

Origins
Robert Willoughby was born at Brook (anciently "Broke"), Westbury, Wiltshire, in around 1452. He was the son of Sir John Willoughby of the family of the Barons Willoughby of Eresby, seated at Eresby Manor, Spilsby, Lincolnshire. His mother was Anne Cheyne, second daughter and co-heiress of Sir Edmund Cheyne (1401–1430) of Brook, by his wife Alice Stafford, only daughter and eventual heiress of Sir Humphrey Stafford (c.1379–1442) "With the Silver Hand", of Hooke, Dorset, and of Southwick, North Bradley, Wiltshire, and an aunt of Humphrey Stafford, 1st Earl of Devon (d. 1469). Sir Edmund was the son and heir of William Cheyne (c.1374–1420) by his wife Cecily Strecche (d.1443); William was the son of Sir Ralph Cheyne (c.1337–1400) of Poyntington in Somerset, and of Brook  (three times Member of Parliament for Wiltshire, Deputy Justiciar of Ireland, Lord Chancellor of Ireland, and Deputy Warden of the Cinque Ports) by his wife Joan Pavely, daughter and co-heiress of Sir John Pavely of Brook.

Career
He was High Sheriff of Cornwall in 1479 and High Sheriff of Devon in 1480. He was Lord of the Manor of Callington and steward of the Duchy of Cornwall.

The barony of Willoughby de Broke, named after the manor of Brook, Westbury, Wiltshire, was created when Robert Willoughby was summoned to Parliament by writ in 1492. On his death on 23 August 1502, the title passed to his eldest son Robert Willoughby, 2nd Baron Willoughby de Broke. He died at the manor house of Callington, for he directed in his will that he should be buried in the church of the parish he died in.

Marriage and children
He married in 1472 Blanche Champernowne, daughter and heiress of John Champernowne of Bere Ferrers, Devon, by Elizabeth Bigbury. John was the son of Alexander Champernowne of Modbury and Joan Ferrers, da. of Martyn Ferrers of Bere Ferrers. He thus acquired the manors of Callington, Cornwall and Bere Ferrers, amongst others.

He had four children with Blanche:
Robert Willoughby, 2nd Baron Willoughby de Broke (d. 1521). Predeceased by his son and heir Edward, whereupon the title became abeyant in 1521 between Edward's three daughters and was terminated around 1535, when daughter Elizabeth became sole heiress. Buried at Bere Ferrers.
Elizabeth, who married firstly John Dynham, 1st Baron Dynham, and secondly William FitzAlan, 18th Earl of Arundel.
John (died young)
Anthony (died young)

Sources
Hamilton Rogers, W.H., The Strife of the Roses & Days of the Tudors in the West, Exeter, 1890, "Our Steward of Household", Robert, Lord Willoughby de Broke, K.G., pp. 1–37 online text, freefictionbooks; online text, with images, Project Gutenburg. Although Hamilton Rogers claims that de Broke was Steward of the Duchy of Cornwall, he may have confused him with his son, the 2nd Baron Robert Willoughby de Broke, who was Lord Steward and Lord Warden of the Stannaries in Cornwall and Devon: see list of Lord Wardens of the Stannaries.

Further reading
 Hamilton Rogers, William Henry The Ancient Sepulchral Effigies and Monumental and Memorial Sculpture of Devon, Exeter, 1877, pp. 346–7 & Appendix 3, pedigree of Willoughby de Broke.
 
 
 
 Baron Willoughby of Broke from Crofts Peerage.

References

1452 births
1502 deaths
16th-century English nobility
People from Wiltshire
Robert
High Sheriffs of Cornwall
High Sheriffs of Devon
15th-century English people
Bere Ferrers
1